The Calgary Energy Centre is a combined cycle power plant located on the northeast corner of Calgary, Alberta. Powered by a single Westinghouse W502-FD2 combustion turbine, the waste heat is then ducted into a Heat Recovery Steam Generator from Nooter/Eriksen. This steam is then used to power a steam turbine built by Fuji Electric.,

References

Natural gas-fired power stations in Alberta
Power stations in Alberta